Brian Foster  (born 4 January 1954 in Roddymoor, Crook, Co. Durham) is a British experimental particle physicist. He is Donald H. Perkins Professor of Experimental Physics at the department of physics, University of Oxford, and formerly Alexander von Humboldt Professor at the University of Hamburg. He was leading scientist at DESY where his research topics include new methods of acceleration, deep inelastic scattering using the ZEUS particle detector, and the International Linear Collider.

Honours and awards

Foster was awarded a Humboldt Research Award in 1998 and both the Max Born Prize and the Order of the British Empire in 2003. He was selected for an Alexander von Humboldt professorship in 2011. Foster was elected to the Royal Society in 2008. He served as a Vice-President of the Royal Society in 2018 and was elected Honorary Fellow of the UK Institute of Physics in 2020.

References

External links
 Author page at INSPIRE-HEP

21st-century British physicists
20th-century British physicists
Experimental physicists
Particle physicists
1954 births
Living people
Alumni of the University of Oxford
Fellows of Balliol College, Oxford